Rizokarpaso ( []) is a town on the Karpas Peninsula in the Northeastern part of Cyprus. While nominally part of the Famagusta District of the Republic of Cyprus, it has been under the de facto control of Northern Cyprus since the division of the island in 1974, being administered as part of the İskele District.

Rizokarpaso is one of the largest towns on the peninsula. Soil near the town consists of terra fusca, which is very fertile. Local crops include carob, cotton, tobacco, and grain. The town's surroundings are renowned for being the wildest and one of the most unspoilt parts of the island. The municipality's territory features the Karpaz National Park, home to the Karpass donkey and some of the finest beaches of the island.

The economy is primarily based on agriculture, husbandry, and fisheries. Since 2000, the town has embraced the concept of eco-tourism, and converted old traditional village houses into guesthouses in traditional styles. The area lacks any industrial plants.

Geography
Two kilometres north of the town of Rizokarpaso lies the Ayfilon Beach, administered by the municipality as a public beach. The beach takes its name from the Ayios Philon Church in the ancient town of Karpasia, which is located 500 metres away. The beach is a breeding ground for loggerhead sea turtles, and is as such a center of attention for conservationists. It is also billed in tourist guides as a "spot to watch sunsets". It hosts an annual festival dedicated to sea turtles in August featuring concerts, release of turtle hatchlings, beach clean-ups, and other environmental awareness activities on the beach.

Climate

History

The Rizokarpaso area contains some of the earliest inhabited places in the island. These include the ancient cities of Karpasia and Aphendrika. It was the seat of one of the largest Lusignan baronies.

In 1222, the Lusignan dynasty ruling the Kingdom of Cyprus, together with the Latin nobility, decided that the traditional Greek Cypriot bishoprics in the urban centres would be abolished. Karpasia was one of the only four Greek bishoprics in the island that were allowed to continue to function (together with Solea, Arsinoe and Lefkara), and in practice subsumed the Bishopric of Famagusta, as the Bishop of Famagusta was sent to Rizokarpaso and continued his work in St. Synesios, the main Orthodox church in the region. This arrangement was formalised by the Bulla Cypria, a papal bull issued by Pope Alexander IV in 1260. Despite the official assignment of the bishopric to Karpasia, by then the town had lost the importance it held in the Late Antique period, and it is thought to be "probable" that by 1260 the bishops did not really reside in Karpasia but kept on operating from Famagusta. According to Stefano Lusignan, the town of Rizokarpaso became a part of the feudal estate of the de Nores family, until James II of Cyprus revoked Gauthier de Nores' rights due to his support of Queen Charlotte, James' opponent.

The town has two churches: St. Synesios and the church of the Holy Trinity. They are examples of the typical Cypriot mixed style, combining features of the late Gothic introduced by the Lusignans with the late Byzantine style of the Orthodox tradition. These are two of the few Christian churches to operate in the northern part of Cyprus, and has allegedly had services stopped by the Turkish Cypriot police.

Rizokarpaso is partly located in the ancient city of Karpasia on the West coast, according to legend founded by king Pygmalion.

Demographics 
Before 1974, the town was predominantly inhabited by Greek-Cypriots. During the Turkish invasion of Cyprus in 20 July 1974, the peninsula was cut off by Turkish troops, and this prevented the town's Greek-Cypriot inhabitants from fleeing to the south. As a result, with 250 Greek Cypriot inhabitants, Rizokarpaso is the home of the biggest Greek population in the North. Between 1974 and 1985, however, around 2500 Greek Cypriots left the village. Although the Greek-Cypriot population is now mainly elderly and shrinking in size, they are still supplied by the UN, and Greek-Cypriot products are consequently available in some places. The town was captured by the Turkish Army during the early days of the Turkish invasion of Cyprus.

In 1977, Turkish settlers were brought from different areas of Turkey, including Kars, Muş, Diyarbakır and Ağrı in the Eastern Anatolia Region, Mersin and  Adana in the Mediterranean Region and Akkuş, Çarşamba, Akçaabat, Sürmene, Araklı and Trabzon in the Black Sea Region. In the 21st century, some Turkish Cypriots and Europeans also bought properties in the village and are now its residents.

Politics 
The town has a Turkish Cypriot municipality, whose current mayor is Suphi Coşkun from the Republican Turkish Party. Coşkun won the post in 2014, by winning over 50% of the votes and beating his predecessor, Mehmet Demirci of the National Unity Party.

Culture and tourism

Turkish Cypriot Dipkarpaz Sports Club was founded in 1978; its football team in 2015 played in Cyprus Turkish Football Association (CTFA) K-PET 2nd League. Education in the town includes a primary school and the Recep Tayyip Erdogan Secondary School. The town hosts some small touristic facilities. Twenty kilometres east lies the Golden Beach, a pristine 4 km long beach, and the Apostolos Andreas Monastery.

International relations

Twin towns – sister cities
Rizokarpaso is twinned with:
 Ankara, Turkey (since 1986)
 Pendik, Istanbul, Turkey (since 1986)
 Yasamal, Baku, Azerbaijan (since 2005)
 Ardeşen, Rize, Turkey
 Tatvan, Bitlis, Turkey

See also
 Rizokarpaso Primary School
 Kormakitis

References

External links
 Photos of Rizokarpaso

Communities in Famagusta District
Populated places in İskele District
Municipalities of Northern Cyprus
Greek enclaves in Northern Cyprus